Benjamin Jermaine Talley (born July 14, 1972) is a former American football linebacker who played two seasons in the National Football League (NFL) with the New York Giants and Atlanta Falcons. He was drafted by the Giants in the fourth round of the 1995 NFL Draft. He played college football at the University of Tennessee and attended Griffin High School in Griffin, Georgia.

College football
Talley played for the Tennessee Volunteers from 1991 to 1994. He started all twelve games for the Volunteers his senior year in 1994, the third year he did so. He also earned All-Southeastern Conference second-team honors after recording 72 tackles and 5.5 sacks in 1994.

Professional career
Talley was selected by the New York Giants with the 133rd overall pick in the 1995 NFL Draft. He was a member of the Giants from 1995 to 1996, appearing in four games for the team during the 1995 season. He played in eight games with the Atlanta Falcons in 1998.

References

External links
Just Sports Stats
College stats

Living people
1972 births
Players of American football from Georgia (U.S. state)
American football linebackers
African-American players of American football
Tennessee Volunteers football players
New York Giants players
Atlanta Falcons players
People from Griffin, Georgia
21st-century African-American sportspeople
20th-century African-American sportspeople